Hatun Sisiwa (Quechua hatun big, Hispanicized spelling Jatun Sisihua) is a  mountain in the Wansu mountain range in the Andes of Peru. It is situated in the Arequipa Region, La Unión Province, Huaynacotas District. Hatun Sisiwa lies northeast of Sullu Marka.

References 

Mountains of Peru
Mountains of Arequipa Region